Oak Mountain Amphitheatre, formerly known as the Verizon Wireless Music Center, is an outdoor amphitheater, owned by Live Nation, located in Pelham, Alabama, USA, a few miles south of Birmingham. It is the largest outdoor music venue in Alabama.

It is unusual in that it features three tiers of reserved seating, with no general admission seating area.

John Mayer performed and recorded his show here, on September 12, 2002, which was later released as a CD/DVD, titled Any Given Thursday.

See also
 List of contemporary amphitheaters

External links
Official site

Amphitheaters in the United States
Buildings and structures in Shelby County, Alabama